Esprit is a surname and given name.

Surname
 Jacques Esprit (1611–1677), French moralist and writer

Given name
 Esprit Barthet (1919–1999), Maltese artist
 Esprit Antoine Blanchard (1696–1770), French baroque composer
 Esprit Calvet (1728–1810), French physician and collector 
 Esprit-Joseph Chaudon (1738–1800), French bibliographer and writer
 Esprit Fléchier (1632–1710), French preacher and author
 Esprit Jouffret (1837–1904), French officer and mathematician
A winged unicorn in Dream a Little Dream

See also
 Wandering Spirit (Cree leader), aka Esprit Errant